A slow jam is music with rhythm and blues and soul influences. Slow jams are commonly R&B ballads or downtempo songs, and are mostly soft-sounding with heavily emotional or romantic lyrical content. The earliest known use of the term is the 1983 Midnight Star recording "Slow Jam" on their album No Parking on the Dance Floor.

Essence magazine compiled a list of the "25 Best Slow Jams of All Time", containing songs of the 1970s, 1980s and 1990s, and Complex compiled a list of 100 slow jams in "The Best Songs to Get You in the Mood".

In radio
In 1983, Kevin "Slow Jammin'" James created the radio show Slow Jam on WKYS, named after the Midnight Star song, then later the Weekend Slow Jam show.

In 1994, R Dub! created the radio show Sunday Nite Slow Jams on Power 1490 KJYK in Tucson, AZ. Today Sunday Night Slow Jams is heard on over 200 radio stations in 17 countries.

See also
 List of soul ballads

References

Song forms
 
 
Soul music genres
Contemporary R&B genres